is a fictional character and the protagonist from the manga Berserk by Kentaro Miura. Guts is a mercenary who travels from company to company and companionship to companionship. After meeting Griffith, Guts is defeated in battle by Griffith and is forced to join the Band of the Hawk as the latter proclaims he now "owns" him. The dynamic and turbulent relationship between Guts and Griffith, the leader of the Band of the Hawk, forms the primary focus of the manga. After the events of the Eclipse, during which he loses his left forearm and right eye, Guts seeks revenge on Griffith. 

The character has also appeared in the animated adaptations of Berserk as well as video games with multiple voice actors. Miura conceptualized Guts' character while they were an assistant to George Morikawa. He mentions multiple influences including Fist of the North Star, Dororo, Mad Max, Conan the Barbarian, among others. 

Critical response to Guts has been highly positive. Guts has been praised for the themes he embodies as a result of his tragic backstory and how he becomes an anti-hero in the process, to the point of being of one of the most iconic characters in manga and anime.

Creation and design
While briefly working as an assistant to George Morikawa at 18, Kentaro Miura had already planned some ideas for Berserks development, having a dark warrior with a gigantic sword illustrated in his portfolio who would later become the first conception of Guts.

Miura stated that the inspiration for the series' title was diffuse at the time of creation. He did not have information about the berserkers or the Berserker Armor (which first appeared in the 222nd chapter) planned out from the start. He chose the word, telling himself that "its mysterious aspect would stick well". Miura said that the title was connected to Guts’s imagery, influenced by Mad Max's eponymous character, further elaborating: "In short, starting from a world with a dark hero who is burning for revenge, prompts you to imagine a rabid character. When, guided by his anger, he will pour out this rage on overpowered enemies, we must insist on his fanaticism if you want to stay consistent. That’s why I thought "Berserk" would make a perfect title to represent my universe".

Characterization and influences
Some aspects of Guts (personality and design) were partially inspired by Miura's highschool friend and later fellow manga artist , by Mad Max, and by Rutger Hauer's performances in Flesh and Blood, Blade Runner, The Hitcher and The Blood of Heroes. Guts' prosthetic hand was inspired by Dororos Hyakkimaru and Cobra eponymous protagonist.

Miura commented that when drawing the Dragon Slayer, he wanted to emulate the effect of Kenshiro's or Raoh's (Fist of the North Star) fist "flying out from the page", but he felt that Gut's sword did not have the same feeling of weight as a fist. He wanted to convey an “extension of reality” feel to the sword, similar to the depiction of the Fist of the North Stars Hokuto Shinken martial art, and make it believable for the readers. 
Miura stated that “Black Swordsman” Guts was the first thing he was set on, but he did not have any idea about what his backstory would be. He focused on the character development up until around the third or fourth volume and then he would think about what brought him to revenge. Miura also said that the story of fight between Guts and Griffith speaks about their change after having built their personalities. Miura stated that he based the Band of the Hawk on his own high school friend relationship experience. Specifically, he mentioned that his friendship with later fellow manga artist Koji Mori partially inspired the Guts and Griffith's relationship.

In regards to his design, Miura did not conceive the idea of giving Guts' an armor to protect him during battles before the series' publication. Miura claimed everything was in place for this element to be obvious. The manga author found this arrival of powerups to use against overpowered antagonists to be more common in shōnen manga than seinen manga. Originally, Miura aimed Guts to solve all of his issues with physical strength until the manga took a more magical setting. He then came with the idea of the Berserker Armor, an armor that gives the user immense physical strength at the cost of driving them crazy. Miura felt this was perfect for the series and that it gives more meaning to its title of "Berserk."

Casting

The character of Guts was voiced by Nobutoshi Canna in Japanese for the 1997 anime; Hiroaki Iwanaga replaced him for the Japanese movies, the 2016 anime and Berserk and the Band of the Hawk. For English, Marc Diraison voiced him in the 1997 anime and movies; Kaiji Tang voiced him in the 2016 anime; and Michael Bell voiced him in Sword of the Berserk: Guts' Rage.

Appearances

Berserk manga
Considered by many as the pure personification of strength and will, Guts is a Byronic hero who is born as one who may be able to struggle against causality but who is unable to maintain it indefinitely. The second story arc of the series revolves around his childhood and adolescence in a mercenary band after being adopted by the band's leader Gambino, and his later joining of, and departure from, the Band of the Hawk.

The dynamic and turbulent relationship between Guts and Griffith, the leader of the Band of the Hawk, forms the primary focus of the manga for the first thirteen volumes. After the events of the Eclipse, during which he loses his left forearm and right eye, Guts seeks revenge on Griffith, who is now Femto. In the process, he is reunited with Casca after a separation of two years. Following the Incarnation Ceremony at Albion, Guts travels with a new group of companions.

Other appearances
Guts is a playable character in  the video games, Sword of the Berserk: Guts' Rage and Berserk: Millennium Falcon Hen Seima Senki no Shō which adapt Guts' role in the manga.

Berserk and the Band of the Hawk also feature the main character as a playable one. Guts is a guest character in the video game Shin Megami Tensei: Liberation Dx2.

Reception
Guts' characterization has been the subject of studies. According to SyFy, Guts struggles with destiny itself and is constantly resisting the pull of predetermination. Critics noted that Guts, at the beginning of the story, is presented as an antihero who does not care about killing and is indifferent to people who aid him. Guts does not act in accordance with definitions of right and wrong, he operates within a gray area, and does not attempt to be heroic or protect the innocent. However, as the story progresses, it is shown that he is in fact a person who is deeply conflicted internally, giving him notable depths. His tragic and traumatic past, unfolded in the Golden Age arc, proves that Guts is a much more complex character according to Mania, The Fandom Post, and Anime News Network.

Other topics focused on Guts involve friendship, camaraderie and human relations. As a child, Guts tries to build some level of friendship with his mercenary group, but due to his traumatic experience with them, he lost trust in people. However, through the time he is with Griffith and the rest of the Band of the Hawk, Guts forms bonds, friendships, animosities and co-dependencies, maturing as well as an individual. Jacob Chapman of Anime News Network, wrote that through their friendship, Guts' ambitions were elevated and Griffith's were lowered, allowing both of them to consider a new future for the first time, one where they fight side-by-side as equals and die on the battlefield, but they reject this future out of their own personal fears, as Guts did not think he was "good enough" for a happy future and Griffith was terrified of his lofty dream crumbling into something more mundane. When Guts comes running to rescue him during the Eclipse, Griffith reaches his moment of anagnorisis, with his thought: "You're the only one…who made me forget my dream".

Betrayal and revenge are major themes in the series. Guts suffered his first betrayal when Gambino sold Guts' body to another soldier for a few coins. Guts is in a quest for revenge after his comrades were betrayed by Griffith and sacrificed by the God Hand. This desire for vengeance has been his main reason of survival. Reviewing the first two volumes, Greg McElhatton of Read About Comics wrote: "it's still hard to identify what about Berserk brings across such a fascination. Is it the characters? The visual look of the monsters? The little hints of a troubled past, like Guts's tattoo that oozes blood? All of the above? I'm not sure, but I do know that I'm hooked." Chetri called Miura a "splendid storyteller whose artwork is stark and bold enough to bring the world of Guts to life magnificently."

Ramsey Isler of IGN stated that Guts "served as a template for many heroes that came after him", adding that the "ridiculously big sword he wields" started a trend, spread to characters like Cloud Strife from Final Fantasy VII and Ichigo Kurosaki from Bleach. Video game director Hideaki Itsuno and producer Hiroyuki Kobayashi are fans of Berserk, and the role-playing hack and slash game Dragon's Dogma included armor based on Guts and Griffith's. Yoko Taro stated that the protagonist of Drakengard, Caim, was inspired by Guts. The character's role in the animated adaptations has also been praised. According to AnimeNation "the viewer wants to know what happened to make Guts appear as he does in the first episode". Carlo Ross of THEM Anime Reviews stated that Guts comes across as more interesting protagonist when portrayed alongside Griffith whose betrayal leaves a major impact in understanding of Guts' silent and dark personality. Anime News Network agreed, stating that Guts comes across as a tragic humanized individual when his past is explored. Guts' quest for vengeance was commented by IGN to be properly done. Kaiji Tang's work as Guts' voice actor was well-received by Anime News Network for providing "a wonderfully deep, gravel-voiced interpretation" of the character.

References

Adoptee characters in anime and manga
Anime and manga characters who can move at superhuman speeds
Anime and manga characters with superhuman strength
Berserk (manga)
Comics characters introduced in 1989
Fantasy anime and manga characters
Fictional amputees
Fictional archers
Fictional assassins in comics
Fictional characters missing an eye
Fictional characters with disfigurements
Fictional characters with dissociative identity disorder
Fictional characters with post-traumatic stress disorder
Fictional characters with superhuman durability or invulnerability
Fictional child soldiers
Fictional commanders
Fictional demon hunters
Fictional knights
Fictional male martial artists
Fictional mass murderers
Fictional mercenaries in comics
Fictional military captains
Fictional patricides
Fictional sole survivors
Fictional swordfighters in anime and manga
Fictional victims of child sexual abuse
Fictional war veterans
Male characters in anime and manga
Martial artist characters in anime and manga
Orphan characters in anime and manga
Vigilante characters in comics